Chessa is a surname. Notable people with the surname include:

Aurelio Chessa (1913–1996), Italian anarchist, journalist and historian
Carlo Chessa (1855–1912), Italian painter, printmaker and illustrator
Dennis Chessa (born 1992), German footballer
Gigi Chessa (1898–1935), Italian painter, architect, scenic designer and potter
Luciano Chessa (born 1971), Italian composer, performer and musicologist
Massimo Chessa (born 1995), Italian basketball player
Pasquale Chessa (born 1947), Italian historian and journalist